Lot in Sodom is a 1933 short silent experimental film, based on the Biblical tale of the city of Sodom and Gomorrah. It was directed by James Sibley Watson and Melville Webber.
 
The movie uses experimental techniques, avant-garde imagery and strong allusions to sexuality, especially homosexuality.

Louis Siegel was the sound composer, according to the film's opening credits.

Storyline
The story is much closer to the tale than other films like Sodom and Gomorrah.

Sodom is a place of sin. An angel appears there and he is welcomed by Lot. The people of Sodom want to have sex with him. Lot refuses; then the angel tells him to escape the city with his wife and daughter. Sodom is then destroyed by flames; Lot's wife is turned to a pillar of salt for having looked back.

All intertitles are quotes from the Bible.

Cast
 Friedrich Haak as Lot
 Hildegarde Watson as Lot's wife
 Dorothea Haus as Lot's daughter
 Lewis Whitbeck as the angel

See also
Sodom und Gomorrha (1922) – an Austrian film directed by Michael Curtiz
Sodom and Gomorrah (1963) – a film directed by Robert Aldrich which depicts the destruction of the two cities for their decadence and human cruelty.
Nitrate Kisses (1992) – an experimental film by Barbara Hammer that uses footage from Lot in Sodom.
A World Lit Only by Fire (2014) – an album by Godflesh featuring cover art taken from Lot in Sodom.

External links
 
 

1933 films
American LGBT-related short films
American silent short films
American avant-garde and experimental films
American black-and-white films
Films based on the Book of Genesis
Films directed by James Sibley Watson
1930s LGBT-related films
Sodom and Gomorrah
1930s American films